Dickerson is an unincorporated community in Champaign County, Illinois, United States. Dickerson is west of Fisher.

References

Unincorporated communities in Champaign County, Illinois
Unincorporated communities in Illinois